Bria Vinaite (born Barbora Bulvinaitė on June 10, 1993) is a Lithuanian-born American actress, known for her role as Halley in Sean Baker's 2017 film The Florida Project, which was her first acting role. She received critical acclaim for her performance.

Early life
Vinaite was born in Alytus, Lithuania and moved to Brooklyn, New York City at age 6.

Career
The Florida Project was Vinaite's acting debut, where she played the lead role of Halley, a former stripper and single mother living at a budget motel close to Walt Disney World. Baker contacted Vinaite after seeing her in an Instagram post, where she documented her life so she could stay in contact with friends in New York City while living in Miami. Vinaite had three weeks of acting classes from acting teacher Samantha Quan before filming began. Production wrapped in September 2016.

She made a cameo in Drake's music video for "Nice for What," released in April 2018. She also had a recurring role on the second season of The OA. Vinaite will next appear in Violent Delights directed by Taylor DeVoe.

Personal life
Vinaite has many tattoos; she got her first at the age of 14. She was sent to boarding school around this time. She left home at 18, choosing to develop her own career rather than attend college. At 19, she started a clothing line called ChroniCal Designs, selling marijuana-themed bikinis and baseball caps.

Vinaite married chef Michael Voltaggio on November 18, 2022 in Hawaii.

Filmography

References

External links

1993 births
Living people
21st-century Lithuanian actresses
Lithuanian film actresses
Lithuanian television actresses
People from Alytus
Lithuanian emigrants to the United States